

Codes

References

W